UGC 2885 (Rubin's Galaxy, nicknamed "Godzilla galaxy")  is a large barred spiral galaxy of type SA(rs)c in the constellation Perseus. It is also a possible member of the Pisces-Perseus supercluster.

UGC 2885 is a spiral galaxy with a relatively low surface brightness. The central bulge is the most prominent feature of this galaxy, where a faint bar crosses its center.

UGC 2885 is classified as a field galaxy—a class of galaxies found in remote, under-dense and “vacant” sections of space, far from other major galaxies. NASA has reported that the theorized main source for disk growth for UGC 2885 came from the  accretion of intergalactic hydrogen gas, rather than through the repeated process of galactic collision, as most galaxies are thought to grow.

The lack of interaction is evident from the near-perfect structure of the spiral arms and disk, lack of tidal tails, and modest rate of star formation—approximately 0.5 solar masses/year.

Additionally, despite being originally classified as an unbarred spiral galaxy, new Hubble images clearly show the presence of a small bar cutting across the ring structure of the core. This is peculiar, as most bars are thought to form through minor gravitational perturbations brought on by satellite and neighboring galaxies, which is something this galaxy lacks. This galaxy highlights that bars are able to form in spiral galaxies without the influence of another galaxy—this indicates that other forces, such as interactions between stars, gas and dust, as well as the gravitational influence of dark matter, might play a role in their development.

On 17 January 2002, the explosion of a type II supernova was detected as SN 2002F.

See also
 IC 1101
 NGC 6872 and IC 4970, mistakenly claimed to be the largest spiral galaxy in 2013
 Malin 1, the largest known spiral galaxy
 NGC 262

References

External links
 UGC 2885 at SIMBAD

Perseus (constellation)
Unbarred spiral galaxies
02885
MCG objects
IRAS catalogue objects
Low surface brightness galaxies
Interacting galaxies